Fatmir is an Albanian masculine given name, a compound of the Albanian fat (luck) and mirë (good). The name may refer to:

Fatmir Agalliu (1933–1998), Albanian academic 
Fatmir Besimi (born 1975), Macedonian politician and economist of Albanian ethnicity
Fatmir Bushi (born 1963), Albanian weightlifter 
Fatmir Caca (born 1985), Albanian football defender
Fatmir Dalladaku (born 1953), German cardiac surgeon of Albanian origin
Fatmir Doga (born 1967), Albanian actor
Fatmir Efica (born 1961), Albanian sports journalist and radio commentator
Fatmir Frashëri (1941–2019), Albanian football player 
Fatmir Gjata (1922–1989), Albanian writer 
Fatmir Haxhiu (1927–2001), Albanian painter 
Fatmir Hysenbelliu (born 1992), Albanian football midfielder
Fatmir Limaj (born 1971), politician from Kosovo
Fatmir Mediu (born 1967), Albanian politician
Fatmir Musaj (born 1958), Albanian painter 
John (Pelushi) (Fatmir Pelushi born 1956), Albanian Orthodox metropolitan of Korça
Fatmir Sejdiu (born 1951), politician from Kosovo
Fatmir Toçi (born 1958), Albanian publisher 
Fatmir Vata (born 1971), Albanian football player
Fatmir Xhafaj (born 1959), Albanian politician

Albanian masculine given names